The Ara Damansara Mosque or Masjid Ara Damansara is the first mosque built in the township of Ara Damansara located near Petaling Jaya, Selangor, Malaysia.

History
The mosque was built by Sime Darby Properties which is also a developer of Ara Damansara. Construction of the mosque began in 2013 and was completed in 2015. This mosque was officially opened to the public in December 2015.

Features
Modern futuristic mosque

See also
 Islam in Malaysia

Mosques in Selangor
2015 establishments in Malaysia
Mosques completed in 2015